Nhill railway station is located on the Western standard gauge line in Victoria, Australia. It serves the town of Nhill, and it opened on 19 January 1887.

A number of large grain silos are located in the goods yard, located at the Up end of the station.

The last Victorian Railways service to stop at Nhill was the Dimboola to Serviceton service that ceased on 1 December 1978. In March 2007, The Overland passenger service began stopping at the station.

Much of the station was extensively altered in the 1980s, following the introduction of CTC between Ararat and Serviceton, including the removal of the signal box, interlocking and all signals.

Platforms and services

Nhill has one platform. It is serviced by Journey Beyond The Overland services.

Platform 1:
 services to Adelaide Parklands and Melbourne Southern Cross

References

External links
Victorian Railway Stations gallery

Regional railway stations in Victoria (Australia)